Momoh Conteh (born 1 December 1999) is a Sierra Leonean footballer who plays for Maryland Bobcats FC in the National Independent Soccer Association and the Sierra Leone national team.

History

Conteh made his debut for Sierra Leone on 13 October 2020 in an internationally friendly against Niger. He started and played over 70 minutes before being subbed off.

References

External links
 

1999 births
Living people
Sierra Leonean footballers
Sierra Leone international footballers
Association football forwards
Association football midfielders
National Independent Soccer Association players